Mierzyce  is a village in the administrative district of Gmina Wierzchlas, within Wieluń County, Łódź Voivodeship, in central Poland.

References

Mierzyce
Kalisz Governorate
Łódź Voivodeship (1919–1939)